The Terrible Twosome (Portuguese: A Dupla do Barulho) is a 1953 Brazilian comedy film directed by Carlos Manga and starring Oscarito, Grande Otelo and Edith Morel.

Cast
 Oscarito as Tinoco 
 Grande Otelo as Tião  
 Edith Morel 
 Mara Abrantes 
 Renato Restier  
 Wilson Grey  
 Fregolente
 Gregorio Barrios 
 Hélio Celano
 Paulo Correa 
 Paulo Croccia  as Ronaldo  
 Clóvis de Castro 
 Átila Iório 
 Roberto Leandro
 Madame Lou  as Madame Chouchou  
 Nelson Morrisson  
 Blanche Mur 
 Ana Maria Neumann 
 Ilma Pereira  
 João Péricles 
 Adriano Reys  as Reporter  
 Frederico Schlee  as Van Der Fleet  
 Aloisio Viana  
 Anthony Zamborsky  as Coronel Mata Gatos

References

Bibliography
 Shaw, Lisa & Dennison, Stephanie. Brazilian National Cinema. Routledge, 2014.

External links

1953 comedy films
1953 films
Brazilian comedy films
Brazilian black-and-white films
1950s Portuguese-language films